Wênio Moraes Pio (born 9 September 1979), known simply as Wênio, is a Brazilian footballer who plays for Mineiros Esporte Clube as a defensive midfielder.

He usually sported a distinctive peroxide blonde hair, and spent most of his professional career in Portugal, amassing Primeira Liga totals of 170 games and three goals over the course of eight seasons, mainly in representation of Marítimo.

Football career
Born in Mineiros, Goiás, Wênio was relatively unknown when he signed for C.S. Marítimo from Sport Club Corinthians Alagoano in 2002. However, he went on to become an essential midfield element for the Madeira club, appearing in 30 Primeira Liga games in the 2003–04 campaign as it achieved a final UEFA Cup spot. On 12 November 2007 he scored a rare goal, in a 2–0 derby away win against C.D. Nacional.

In June 2008, Wênio signed a three-year contract with Vitória S.C. in Guimarães. After one season – and 16 top division matches – he was released, joining fellow league side Leixões S.C. shortly after.

After a brieft stint in Azerbaijan with FC Baku, Wênio returned to his country and region and signed with amateurs Morrinhos Futebol Clube. He continued to play in Brazil's lower leagues in the following years.

References

External links

Futebol de Goyaz profile 

1979 births
Living people
Brazilian footballers
Association football midfielders
Campeonato Brasileiro Série C players
Sport Club Corinthians Alagoano players
Araguaína Futebol e Regatas players
Clube de Regatas Brasil players
Primeira Liga players
Segunda Divisão players
C.S. Marítimo players
Vitória S.C. players
Leixões S.C. players
Azerbaijan Premier League players
FC Baku players
Brazilian expatriate footballers
Expatriate footballers in Portugal
Expatriate footballers in Azerbaijan
Brazilian expatriate sportspeople in Portugal
Sportspeople from Goiás